Very little is known about pre-Christian and pre-Islamic mythology in Eastern Transcaucasia; sources are mostly Hellenic historians like Strabo and based on archaeological evidence.

Dualism

Barhail 
Barhail was one of two major gods.  He keeps sun on his right hand and moon on left hand. His right hand shows East and left hand shows West. If he drops his right hand for a while, world will fall under darkness forever. He decides if days should be longer or shorter.

Sabail 
Sabail was one of two major gods. He was protector of sea and wind. He  stands perpendicular to Barhail. His left hand keeps ocean apart from continents, prevents floods. His right hand keeps weather calm, if he drops that hand, typhoons and storms can occur.

Sun, moon and sky 
Strabo names the gods of the sun, the sky, and above of all, the moon, and equates them to the Greek gods Helios, Zeus, and Selene respectively:

Sacrifice 
According to Strabo, human sacrifice was widely used in pre-Christian Albania:

Ancestor worship 
Unlike many pagan nations, Caucasian Albanians did not practice worship of ancestors. As Strabo states:

Sacred islands 
In East Albania, sacred lands existed in islands of Caspian Sea. Pomponius Mela wrote:

Sacred mountains 
Like Greek, Chinese and Tengrist practices, local inhabitants considered several mountains as sacred. List of sacred mountains according to local legends:
 Babadağ is the fourth highest peak in the Caucasus in Azerbaijan at 3,629 meters. It is located north of İsmayıllı. At the top is a pir dedicated to Hasrat Baba—a person revered as a holy man—who is believed to have lived during the period when the area was known as Caucasian Albania. Babadağ means "Grandfather Mountain".
 Mount Avey is one of the peaks and a whitish-gray ridge in the Small Caucasus Mountains located between Georgia and the Gazakh district. It is 12 km away from the village of Dash Salahli. Avey means "House of the Moon".
 Mount Goyazan is a mountain in northwestern Qazakh Rayon of Azerbaijan. Goyazan means "Skycrusher". According to ancient local beliefs, it was named because of its loneliness and being directed to the sky.
 Khinalug is a mountain where Khinalug people live. Before Islam they were pagan, worshiping "their own fire god".

Temples 
Almost every pagan temple was replaced by churches. Notable temples:
 Kilsedagh church - was a temple dedicated to Mithra, paintings of Mithra can still be seen inside
 Anahit church - was a temple dedicated to Armenian goddess Anahit.
 Chaparly church - archeologic excavations proved that there were pagan temple. In burial site, a human skeleton discovered which buried with his/her own customs, which is unusual to Christian practice.
 Kurmuk church - Church built on old pagan temple during Russian invasion of İlisu.
 Lakit church - Church built on old pagan temple.
 Mamrukh church - Church built on temples belong to Moon and Sun.
 Mingachevir Church Complex - Church complex built on Fire temple. Mostly ruined, but still have pagan symbols. One of them is World tree between two peafowl gravings.

Non-local paganism 
Huns migrated to Caucasus in 6th century AD. They established a polity here. Bishop Israel wrote about the customs of the Huns and their deities:
 Kuara - god of thunder.
 Aspandiat - old Hun hero, which was deified.
 Fire, Water, an unnamed goddess of roads.

Cruxification of St. Bartholomeus 
According to a legend, Bartholomeus came to a place which is on the shore of Caspian Sea which is likely to be Baku, cured the daughter of the local king, Polymius, of her madness, and was subsequently granted by the king the right to preach freely in his territory. The Apostolic Acts of Abdias tell that locals worshipped a goddess by the name of Astaroth. In a competition with the local priesthood, Bartholomew assembled a large crowd in front of an image of the goddess and challenged the deity to show itself. Instead, the statue shattered and an angel appeared. The angel revealed the exorcised demon-deity to the crowd. The goddess, totally black, "sharp faced", and breathing fire and brimstone, was bound in chains by the angel and sent away. The king, amazed at what he had just seen, was immediately baptised along with many of his subjects. The king's brother, Astyages, heard of the baptisms and declared war on the Christian community. Bartolomew was beaten with clubs, skinned alive and then finally beheaded in front of Maiden Tower.

Persecution of pagans

Christian persecution of pagans 
According to Movses Kaghanvatsi, Vachagan III the Pious of Albania persecuted pagan priests, tortured and forcibly converted them to Christianism. He established a Church School in a city called Rustak and raised children of pagan couples as Christian.

Islamic treatment of pagans 
Not much information exists about pagans living during Islamization process of Azerbaijan, because they were converted or executed before arrival of Islam. According to Azerbaijani historian Sara Ashurbeyli several Shahs of Shirvan fought against infidels and even killed by infidels. But it's likely to be country of Sarir.
Estakhri states that pagans still existed during the 10th century. Andalusian traveller Abu Hamid al-Qarnati states that pagans were living in mountainous villages near city of Derbent in the 12th century.

Mongol invasion 
The Mongol invasion can be considered a second wave of paganism in Azerbaijan, but after Ghazan's adoption of Islam as state religion, paganism and shamanism dissolved quickly.

Archeological evidences 
Enormous idols found in archeological sites of Khinisly (near village of Böyük Xınıslı), Chiraghly, Daghkolany. Idols made with local stones. Most of them have no heads or hands. They are mostly tall as height of human. They belong to last centuries of BC. Idol-making technique is not advanced in comparison to Greco-Roman idols.

Influences 
Paganism mostly influenced folklore. Supernatural beings (giants, div, fairies, dwarves) in fairy tales, religious rituals, sacred shrines (pir) plays important role nowadays in Azerbaijan. Azeri metal bands like Vozmezdie and Üör usually refer to paganism in their works.

References 

Religion in Azerbaijan
Eurasian shamanism